In Mandaeism, ʿNbu or Nbu is the Mandaic name for the planet Mercury. Nbu is one of the seven planets, who are part of the entourage of Ruha in the World of Darkness.

Nbu is associated with learning and scribes, as well as Christ and Christianity. Other names for Nbu include Maqurpiil, Mšiha (i.e., Jesus the Messiah), and ʿaṭarid (of Arabic origin). Nbu's name is derived from the Akkadian Nabû.

Buckley (2010) suggests a connection between Dinanukht and Nbu. For instance, in the Zrazta ḏ-Hibil Ziwa (Drower Collection Ms. 44), Nbu is the Lord of Book and ink and wisdom. Similarly, Dinanukht is called the "ink-book of the gods" in Right Ginza 6.

References

Planets in Mandaeism
Mercury (planet) in culture